Islington railway station is located on the Gawler line.

History 

It is unclear when the station opened.

North of the station lie the Islington Railway Workshops. To the west of the station lies the Australian Rail Track Corporation standard gauge line to Crystal Brook. Opposite the station lay a TNT yard that was also used by Holden. The yard had closed by the late 1990s, and remained unused until 2008 when it was completely demolished to make way for a new residential development, which may include the station being re-built or upgraded. In 2014, decontamination of the site commenced.

The station was rebuilt during the Gawler line's closure between December 2020 and June 2022.

Services by platform 
Islington station is served by Adelaide Metro's route 300 Suburban Connector.

References

External links

Railway stations in Adelaide